Women's ice hockey in Great Britain is administered by the English and Scottish Ice Hockey Associations. It is one of the fastest growing areas of the game.

The British Women's Leagues were formed with six teams in 1984. The founder members of the league were:
Brighton Amazons
Cambridge University
Oxford University
Peterborough Ravens
Solihull Vixens
 Streatham Strikers/Storm
Of those teams, only two are still in league play today, Oxford University and Solihull, while the Cambridge University has a non-league team. After the Ravens folded, a new team, the Penguins, was set up in Peterborough.

League structure
In England and Wales, 28 teams play in the British Women's Leagues. The top 6 teams in the country play in the Elite League, with a Premier league consisting of 8 teams, and below that two unequally sized divisions, split by north (consisting of 4 teams) and south (consisting of 9 teams).

In the Premier Division, the sides play each other, one home, once away,  with the team ranked highest being declared champion of the league and promoted to the Elite League.

At the end of the season, the top four Premier sides and top three Division One sides from each region converge for the 'Trophy Weekend'. The Premier Sides play for the Chairman's Cup, while the Division One sides play for the Division One Trophy.

In addition to the playoffs, there is promotion and relegation between the Elite, Premier, and Division 1 leagues. In 2004/05, this was decided with a Playoff Weekend at Coventry. The Division One sides played first in a one-off game; the following day the winner of that game played the 10th ranked team in the Premier league, to decide who played in the Premier and Division 1 leagues for the following season.

In 2007–08 season the EIHA introduced women's U16 teams to the league structure. Three teams (Oxford, Streatham and Bracknell) were created in a Southern Division and four teams were created in the women's U16 Northern Division. For 2008–09, Oxford folded and was replaced by Peterborough in the South.

Teams

Elite League (2019/2020 season)

Bracknell Queen Bees 

Guildford Lightning  
Kingston Diamonds 

Solihull Vixens 
Streatham Storm
Nottingham Vipers

Premier League (2019/2020 season)

Swindon Top Cats
 Whitley Bay Squaws
 Chelmsford Cobras
 Kingston Diamonds B
 Sheffield Shadows
 Milton Keynes Falcons
 Bracknell Firebees

Division 1 North League (2019/2020 season)

 Grimsby Wolves
 Widnes Wild Women
 Telford Wreckin Raiders
 Nottingham Vipers
 Solway Sharks
 Sheffield Shadows

Division 1 South League (2019/2020 season)

 Slough Sirens
 Streatham Storm
 Coventry Phoenix
 Solent Amazons
 Oxford Midnight Stars
 Peterborough Penguins
 Swindon Topcats

History
Below is a list of the winners of the major competitions. The team's standing is shown in win–loss–tie format.

Women's English League
1987/88 - Streatham Strikers (10-1-1)
1986/87 - Oxford University Blues (12-0-0)
1985/86 - Streatham Strikers (11-1-0)
1984/85 - Peterborough Ravens (8-0-0)

The Women's England League was the first incarnation of the league, starting with five teams before moving up to seven by 1988. An influx of interest from new teams resulted in a complete regionalisation of the sport, a system that lasted two years.

Regionalised British League

Overall champion
1989/90 - no official champion*
1988/89 - Oxford City Rockets (beat Streatham Strikers 3–1 in final game)
Oxford City Rockets declared unofficial champions after beating Streatham in a regional playoff by four goals to one. Rockets were never able to play the final against Sunderland (champions of the Northern Division).

Northern Division
1989/90 - Sunderland Scorpions (6–1–1)
1988/89 - Sunderland Scorpions (4–0–2)

Central Division
1989/90 - Oxford City Rockets (12–0–0)
1988/89 - Oxford City Rockets (10–0–0)

Capital/South Division
1989/90 - Streatham Strikers (8–0–0)
1988/89 - Streatham Strikers (10–0–0)

After two years of this format, the system switched to the structure that exists to the present day, making it after 15 years one of the longest lasting formats of any ice hockey league that ever has been in the UK.

British Women's Leagues

Elite League
2018/19 - Bracknell Queen Bees
2017/18 - Bracknell Queen Bees
2016/17 - Solihull Vixens (14–3–3)
2015/16 - Bracknell Queen Bees (12–2–2)

Premier League
2016/17 - Milton Keyes Falcons (9–2–1)
2015/16 - Swindon Top Cats (12–2–0)
2014/15 - Bracknell Queen Bees (13–0–1)
2013/14 - Kingston Hull Diamonds (11–0–3)
2012/13 - Kingston Hull Diamonds (14–0–2)
2011/12 - Kingston Hull Diamonds (12–0–4)
2010/11 - Sheffield Shadows (17–0–1)
2009/10 - Slough Phantoms (17–0–1)
2008/09 - Sheffield Shadows (17–1–0)
2007/08 - Slough Phantoms (17–1–0)
2006/07 - Slough Phantoms (16–1–1)
2005/06 - Newcastle Vipers (15–2–1)
2004/05 - Sunderland Scorpions (16–2–2)
2003/04 - Sunderland Scorpions (16–2–0)
2002/03 - Cardiff Comets (13–2–1)
2001/02 - Guildford Lightning (15–1–0)
2000/01 - Sunderland Scorpions (11–2–1)
1999/00 - Nottingham Vipers (11–2–1)
1998/99 - Slough Phantoms (12–1–1)
1997/98 - Sunderland Scorpions (13–1–0)
1996/97 - Sunderland Scorpions (14–0–0)
1995/96 - Sunderland Scorpions (13–0–1)
1994/95 - Sunderland Scorpions (11–2–1)
1993/94 - Bracknell Queen Bees (9–1–2)
1992/93 - Oxford City Rockets (14–0–0)
1991/92 - Oxford City Rockets (13–0–1)
1990/91 - Oxford City Rockets (9–0–1)

Division One (North)
2016/17 - Billingham Wildcats (9–0–1)
2015/16 - Billingham Wildcats (10–1–1)
2014/15 - Manchester Phoenix (16–1–1)
2013/14 - Whitley Bay Squaws (15–1–0)
2012/13 - Whitley Bay Squaws (14–0–0)
2011/12 - Whitley Bay Squaws (15–1–0)
2010/11 - Sheffield Shadows B (13–0–1)
2009/10 - Flintshire Furies (17–0–1)
2008/09 - Billingham Wildcats (12–1–1)
2007/08 - Nottingham Vipers (11–1–2)
2006/07 - Billingham Wildcats (12–1–1)
2005/06 - Nottingham Vipers (11–0–3)
2004/05 - Billingham Wildcats (12–2–2)
2003/04 - (Telford) Wrekin Raiders (18–1–1)
2002/03 - Flintshire Furies (12–4–0)
2001/02 - Sheffield Shadows (15–0–1)
2000/01 - Billingham Wildcats (15–1–0)
1999/00 - Kingston Hull Diamonds (15–3–2)
1998/99 - Kingston Hull Diamonds (13–2–1)
1997/98 - Kingston Hull Diamonds (10–2–0)
1996/97 - Solihull Vixens (5–2–1)
1995/96 - Solihull Vixens (record unknown)
1994/95 - Sheffield Shadows (8–0–0)
1993/94 - Unknown
1992/93 - Unknown
1991/92 - Unknown
1990/91 - Unknown

Division One (Midlands)
2009/10 - Milton Keyes Falcons (12–2–0)
2008/09 - Milton Keyes Falcons (12–1–1)

Division One (South)
2018/19 - Swindon Topcats (13–2–1)
2017/18 - Basingstoke Bison
2016/17 - Bracknell Firebees (10–1–1)
2015/16 - Invicta Dynamics (12–0–0)
2014/15 - Swindon Top Cats (16–0–0)
2013/14 - Swindon Top Cats (16–0–0)
2012/13 - Chelmsford Cobras (12–0–0)
2011/12 - Cardiff Comets (14–1–1)
2010/11 - Milton Keyes Falcons (17–0–1)
2009/10 - Basingstoke Bison Ladies (13–0–3)
2008/09 - Chelmsford Cobras (13–0–1)
2007/08 - Swindon Top Cats (18–0–0)
2006/07 - Swindon Top Cats (17–1–0)
2005/06 - Swindon Top Cats (17–1–0)
2004/05 - Streatham Storm (17–0–3)
2003/04 - Romford Nighthawks (18–0–0)
2002/03 - Solihull Vixens (17–0–1)
2001/02 - Basingstoke Bison Ladies (15–2–1)
2000/01 - Romford Nighthawks (15–0–1)
1999/00 - Cardiff Comets (14–0–0)
1998/99 - Cardiff Comets (12–0–0)
1997/98 - Basingstoke Bison Ladies (13–0–1)
1996/97 - Romford Nighthawks (7–2–1)
1995/96 - Chelmsford Cobras (record unknown)
1994/95 - Chelmsford Cobras (8–0–0)
1993/94 - Guildford Lightning (record unknown)
1992/93 - Unknown
1991/92 - Unknown
1990/91 - Unknown

U16 Northern Division
2016/17 - Sheffield Shadows U16 (7–0–0)
2015/16 - Sheffield Shadows U16 (7–0–1)
2014/15 - Kingston Hull Junior Diamonds (2–0–1)
2013/14 - Kingston Hull Junior Diamonds (3–0–0)
2012/13 - Kingston Hull Junior Diamonds (4–0–0)
2011/12 - Kingston Hull Junior Diamonds (4–0–0)
2010/11 - Kingston Hull Junior Diamonds (7–1–0)
2009/10 - Kingston Hull Junior Diamonds (record unknown)
2008/09 - Kingston Hull Junior Diamonds (4–0–0)
2007/08 - Kingston Hull Junior Diamonds (5–0–1)

U16 Southern Division
2016/17 - Bracknell Ice Bees (10–2–0)
2015/16 - Bracknell Ice Bees (6–0–0)
2014/15 - Bracknell Ice Bees (6–0–0)
2013/14 - Bracknell Ice Bees (3–1–0)
2012/13 - Bracknell Ice Bees (2–1–1)
2011/12 - Bracknell Ice Bees (8–0–0)
2010/11 - Bracknell Ice Bees (4–0–2)
2009/10 - Bracknell Ice Bees (5–1–0)
2008/09 - Bracknell Ice Bees (7–1–0)
2007/08 - Bracknell Ice Bees (7–1–0)

Trophy Weekend
The Trophy Weekend has been split into the Bill Britton Memorial Trophy and D1 Trophy. The Memorial Trophy sees 1st vs 4th and 2nd vs 3rd in the Premier League, with the winners playing the final the following day.

Prior to the Memorial Trophy being renamed, it was called the Chairman's Cup.

The D1 Trophy sees the Champion of the North playing the runner-up of the South, and Champion of the South vs runner-up of the North, with the winners playing the final the following day.

The introduction of the Women's U16 Northern and Southern (season 2007/08) created a third play-off final between the winners of each league.

Bill Britton Memorial Trophy
2008/09 - Bracknell Queen Bees bt Guildford Lightning (6–0)
2007/08 - Sheffield Shadows bt Slough Phantoms (4–2)
2006/07 - Bracknell Queen Bees bt Newcastle Vipers (2–1)
2005/06 - Sheffield Shadows bt Newcastle Vipers (3–0)

Chairman's Cup
2004/05 - Bracknell Queen Bees bt Sunderland Scorpions (1–0)
2003/04 - Sunderland Scorpions bt Guildford Lightning (2–0)
2002/03 - Cardiff Comets bt Sunderland Scorpions (5–4) (AOT) (APS)
2001/02 - Sunderland Scorpions bt Guildford Lightning (2–1)
2000/01 - Guildford Lightning bt Slough Phantoms (1–0)
1999/00 - Sunderland Scorpions bt Nottingham Vipers (4–0)
1998/99 - Sunderland Scorpions bt Slough Phantoms (6–3)
1997/98 - Sunderland Scorpions bt Bracknell Queen Bees (4–2)
1996/97 - Sunderland Scorpions bt Bracknell Queen Bees (3–2) (AOT)
1995/96 - Unknown
1994/95 - Sunderland Scorpions bt Guildford Lightning (4–2)
1993/94 - Bracknell Queen Bees bt Slough Phamtons (7–2)
1992/93 - Oxford City Rockets bt Bracknell Queen Bees (4–0)
1991/92 - Oxford City Rockets bt Bracknell Queen Bees (2–1) (AOT) (APS)
1990/91 - Oxford City Rockets bt Bracknell Queen Bees (5–1)

Division One Trophy
2007/08 - Swindon Top Cats bt Chelmsford Cobras (6–4)
2006/07 - Swindon Top Cats bt Billingham Wildcats (4–0)
2005/06 - Swindon Top Cats bt Nottingham Vipers (3–1)
2004/05 - Streatham Storm bt Basingstoke Bison Ladies (3–1)
2003/04 - Solihull Vixens bt Whitley Bay Squaws (9–2)
2002/03 - Solihull Vixens bt Flintshire Furies (1–0)
2001/02 - Sheffield Shadows bt Whitley Bay Squaws (7–2)
2000/01 - Billingham Wildcats bt Sheffield Shadows (4–2)
1999/00 - Kingston Hull Diamonds bt Billingham Wildcats (2–1)
1998/99 - Kingston Hull Diamonds bt Cardiff Comets (1–0) (AOT) (APS)
1997/98 - Kingston Hull Diamonds bt Basingstoke Bison Ladies (4–3)
1996/97 - Solihull Vixens bt Kingston Hull Diamonds (5–0)

Women's U16 Trophy 
2008/09 - Bracknell Ice Bees bt Kingston Hull Junior Diamonds (3–2)
2007/08 - Kingston Hull Junior Diamonds bt Bracknell Ice Bees (5–2)

Promotion/relegation playoffs
Information on these playoffs is sketchy; however, the following contains most of them. Playoffs were not held in every season due to either team's not wanting to go for promotion to the higher league, or a natural expansion of the Premier League.

2005/06 - Nottingham Vipers bt Flintshire Furies (11–1)
2004/05 - Streatham Storm bt Swindon Top Cats (1–0)
1999-2004 - Playoff system scrapped, Premier League naturally expanded.
1998/99 - Nottingham Vipers bt Kingston Hull Diamonds (2–1,5–3)
1997/98 - Basingstoke Bison Ladies bt (Telford) Wrekin Raiders (5–0,5–1)
1996/97 - Solihull Vixens bt Chelmsford Cobras (unknown score)
1995/96 - Chelmsford Cobras bt Solihull Vixens (unknown score)
1994/95 - Sheffield Shadows bt Durham Dynamites (unknown score)

Knockout Cup
The Knockout Cup was proposed to allow teams of different standard to play each other, and also to increase the number of competitions played in the women's game.

2006/2007 - Bracknell Queen Bees bt Solihull Vixens (5–0)
2005/2006 - Newcastle Vipers bt Solihull Vixens (5–1)
2004/2005 - Bracknell Queen Bees bt Swindon Top Cats (8–2)
2003/2004 - Kingston Hull Diamonds bt Solihull Vixens (4–3) (APS)
2002/2003 - Bracknell Queen Bees bt Swindon Top Cats (4–1)

Regional/national/international sides
In the UK, there are five sides that play at regional, national and international levels.

Regional Level
England is divided into two regional sides, featuring the best players who have not been selected for Team Great Britain. The regional sides are a recent addition to assist with the development of the top women's and girls' hockey in the UK. For the purposes of the records shown, only games against other regional, national or international teams shall be considered.

In addition, the conference sections are divided into Senior and Junior (U16) teams.
North of England Senior: 1–2
North of England Junior: 1–1
South of England Senior: 1–1
South of England Junior: 1–1

National teams
In total there are three National teams, although Team England has been defunct since 2002. 2006 saw the England team reinstated and an Under 16 England added to the list of national teams. In August 2006 both teams travelled to Prague for a training camp, followed by a tournament in Pilzen which saw the Senior Team play their way to a silver medal.

Details of all Home Internationals known are shown below:
Saturday, 25 June 2005 - Team WALES 4 - 0 Team SCOTLAND @ Cardiff
Saturday, 10 April 2004 - Team SCOTLAND 0 - 7 Team WALES @ Paisley
Saturday, 18 May 2002 - Team ENGLAND 1 - 4 Team WALES @ Nottingham
Saturday, 30 January 1993 - Team ENGLAND 7 - 0 Team SCOTLAND @ Sheffield
Saturday, 16 May 1992 - Team ENGLAND 3 - 1 Team SCOTLAND @ Nottingham
Saturday, 28 December 1991 - Team SCOTLAND 1 - 1 Team ENGLAND @ Murrayfield

The overall records of the teams are therefore:
Team ENGLAND: 2–1–1
Team SCOTLAND: 0–4–1
Team WALES: 3–0–0

Team GB
Team Great Britain is the national side that represents the UK in firstly the European Championships followed by the IIHF World Championships.

Below is a guide to GB's performances year by year. Only 'competitive' games (challenge matches ignored) are counted for the records.

1989
Team GB re-entered the world of international Hockey with a European Championship two-leg qualifying match against the Netherlands in Chelmsford. GB battled hard in both games but were defeated by an experienced Dutch side, winning both games by the margin of four goals to two, giving the Dutch an 8–4 aggregate win and a place in the European Championship.

Overall record: 0–2–0

1990
No official competitions existed; however, GB defeated the Dutch in Amsterdam 1–0 in a challenge match.

1991
Team GB took part in the 1991 European Championship finishing 9th out of 10 teams. Placed in a very tough Group B, they lost their first three games to Sweden (0–16), Denmark (0–4) and Germany (0–6) before surprising the Czech Republic with a 2–2 draw in their final game. GB finished bottom of their group, and played Holland in the 9th/10th playoff which they won 3–0.

Record: 1–3–1

1993
After the break for an Olympic year, GB started again in the newly formed European Championship Pool B. Following an opening loss against Latvia (0–3), GB repeated their performance against the Czech Republic from two years previous, this time with a 1–1 draw. France dispatched GB easily in the third game by 7 goals to 2, and GB won their first international game in the final match of the tournament with a 1–0 win over the Ukraine. giving GB a 4th place finish out of five teams, with GB only missing a medal by one point.

Record: 1–2–1

1995
GB went to Denmark for the IIHF European Women's Championships Pool B in March 1995, faced a tough group on paper and proved to be a tough group on ice. GB fell to their worst defeat in four years in the opening game with a 14–1 defeat to Denmark. Slovakia defeated GB 4–1 and in the final group game Holland put seven past the Brits, with only two coming back.

The 7th/8th playoff game saw GB take on the Ukraine, the only side they had beaten in competitive hockey so far. Ukraine skated to a 2–0 victory which saw GB finish 8th out of eight teams.

Record: 0–4–0

Team roster:

Gill Barton – Guildford
Julie Biles – Guildford
Verity Boome – Guildford
Laura Bugbee – Slough
Sarah Burton – Swindon
Rachael Cotton – Bracknell
Lisa Davies – Bracknell
Lynsey Emmerson – Sunderland
Fiona Johnstone – Swindon
Fiona King – Guildford
Teresa Lewis – Sunderland
Julie Lossnitzer – Slough
Jane McLelland – Sunderland
Jeanette Mountjoy – Bracknell
Sarah Musgrove – Telford
Kathy Nike – Bracknell
Kim Strongman – Guildford
Laura Urquhart – Slough
Louise Wheeler – Slough
Manager – Anne Sheppard. Head Coach – Mike Urquhart. Asst Coaches – Charlie Colon and Paul O'Higgins.

1996
A trip to Slovakia was in store for GB in Pool B in 1996. GB started positively with a much better account against Denmark who they had been routed against the previous year falling only to a 5–0 defeat. Any hopes of a great comeback were dashed in their second game against the Danes who GB had previously done well against, collapsing to a 7–1 defeat. That scoreline was repeated in the final group round game against the Dutch to leave GB adrift at the bottom of their group.

The 7th/8th playoff saw GB take on Kazakhstan and for the first time in the tournament. Kazakhstan was just able to edge ahead and won by the odd goal in 9 leaving GB in 8th out of eight place and without a win in two years.

Record: 0–4–0

Team roster:

Gill Barton – Guildford
Julie Biles – Guildford
Verity Boome – Peterborough
Becky Bowles – Bracknell
Sarah Burton – Swindon
Laura Byrne – Oxford
Rachael Cotton – Bracknell
Lisa Davies – Bracknell
Lynsey Emmerson – Sunderland
Fiona King – Guildford
Teresa Lewis – Sunderland
Jane McLelland – Sunderland
Jeanette Mountjoy – Bracknell
Claire Pannell – Bracknell
Debbie Palmer – Swindon
Nicola Pattinson – Sunderland
Cheryl Smith – Sunderland
Michelle Smith – Sunderland
Kim Strongman – Guildford
Laura Urquhart – Sunderland
Elaine Whitney – Telford

1999
Székesfehérvár, Hungary

Following a re-structure in the World Championships, and no championship in 1998 due to it being an Olympic year, GB finally came back into the new Pool B Qualifying Group to decide the final spot in Pool B for the following year.

Great Britain opened brightly holding Italy to a 1–1 draw after 40 minutes in the opening game before Italy stepping the game up a gear to skate out to a 4–1 victory; however, the signs looked good. The next game was against South Africa, which ended to be a sporting contest on the opening puck drop with GB running up their highest ever victory at international level with a 22–0 victory.

After a slow start in the final game GB hit the host team Hungary hard with five quick goals in a match that ended up as 9–1 to the Brits, leaving them to finish 2nd out of four teams.

Record: 2–1–0

Team roster:

Natalie Arthur – Backburn
Zoe Bayne – Billinghham
Nicola Bicknell – Slough
Vicky Burton – Bracknell
Laura Byrne – Bracknell
Louise Fisher – Slough
Amy Johnson – Haringey
Fiona King – Guildford
Teresa Lewis – Basingstoke
Claire Oldfield – Whitley Bay
Ceri Powell – Solihull
Tasmin Quinn – Basingstoke
Vicky Robbins – Guildford
Cheryl Smith – Slough
Michelle Smith – Slough
Tonia Scialdone – Solihull
Emily Turner – Sheffield
Louise Wheeler – Slough
Manager – Teresa Fisher. Coaches – Mike Urquhart, Laura Urquhart and David Graham.

2000
Székesfehérvár, Hungary

It was back to Hungary in 2000, for the Pool B Qualifying Tournament. GB again had a strong start with the Brits 1–1 against the Group Favorites DPR Korea in their first game. Korea struck back with two 2nd period goals but despite a fightback by GB, the game ended up 4–2 to the Asian side.

Australia were next up for GB and were comfortably dispatched by seven goals to one. GB finally defeated Holland in a competitive game, 11 years after their first attempt with a comfortable 5–2 victory. GB again finished second out of four teams in their group.

Belgium, who finished second in the other group, took on GB in the 3rd/4th place playoff. GB comfortably dispatched the Belgians by 8 goals to 1 which saw GB ranked overall third out of eight teams.

Record: 3–1–0

Team roster:

Natalie Arthur – Blackburn
Zoe Bayne – Billingham
Nicola Bicknell – Slough
Vicky Burton – Bracknell
Laura Byrne – Bracknell
Samantha Cheetham – Bracknell
Louise Fisher – Slough
Susan Hemmerman – Kingston
Amy Johnson – Swindon
Fiona King – Guildford
Claire Oldfield – Whitley Bay
Debbie Palmer – Swindon
Vicky Robbins – Guildford
Tonia Scialdone – Nottingham
Cheryl Smith – Nottingham
Michelle Smith – Nottingham
Emily Turner – Sheffield
Louise Wheeler – Slough
Manager – Teresa Fisher. Head Coach – Laura Urquhart.

2001
Maribor, Slovenia

Pool B overnight was renamed Division 1, but apart from that the challenge stayed the same for GB with their third straight attempt at qualification into the 2nd tier.

GB looked to their first game against hosts Slovenia to set the standard for the tournament and they did not disappoint. 5–0 up after 20 minutes, they went on to win 12–0. Hungary also fell to a GB by 12 goals to 0 in Game 2, and with GB dispatching the Aussies by 4–2 in Game 3 they were left in the pleasant situation of played 3, won 3, scored 28, conceded 2.

Slovakia took on GB in the final game. Despite getting a goal back in the 3rd, Team GB went down to a 4–1 defeat against Slovakia and finished second in their group for the third consecutive year.

Record: 3–1–0

Team roster:

Natalie Arthur – Blackburn
Zoe Bayne – Billingham
Nicola Bicknell – Slough
Laura Burke – Sheffield
Vicky Burton – Bracknell
Laura Byrne – Bracknell
Louise Fisher – Guildford
Susan Hemmerman – Kingston
Amy Johnson – Bracknell
Fiona King – Guildford
Teresa Lewis – Sunderland
Rachel McCabe – Billingham
Claire Oldfield – Whitley Bay
Vicky Robbins – Guildford
Tonia Scialdone – Birmingham
Cheryl Smith – Nottingham
Michelle Smith – Nottingham
Emily Turner – Sheffield
Louise Wheeler – Slough
Gillian Wyatt – Kingston
Manager – Alison McCabe, Head Coach – Tony Hall. Assistant Coach – Reg Wilcox.

2002
Hull, UK

An Olympic year saw no official hockey taking place, but the IIHF hosted a women's challenge tri-series between Italy, Belgium and GB, held in Hull.

GB beat Belgium, but fell to Italy to finish second in the three team group.

Team roster:

Zoe Bayne – Billingham
Kirstin Beattie – Murrayfield
Nicola Bicknell – Slough
Verity Boome – Slough
Heather Brunning – Bracknell
Laura Burke – Sheffield
Vicky Burton – Bracknell
Louise Fisher – Guildford
Alex von Haselberg – Guildford
Susan Hemmerman – Kingston
Fiona King – Guildford
Alice Lamb – Slough
Claire Oldfield – Whitley Bay
Vicky Robbins – Guildford
Tonia Scialdone – Birmingham
Angela Taylor – Paisley
Emily Turner – Sheffield
Gemma Watt – Paisley
Gillian Wyatt – Kingston
Hannah Young – Guildford
Manager – Alison McCabe. Head Coach – Tony Hall. Assistant Coach – Reg Wilcox.

2003
Lecco, Italy

The tea were off to Italy for Division 2, which now sported six teams in direct parity with the men's game for the first time.

GB collapsed to the worst possible start against longtime foes Slovakia. 5–0 down after the first period, they ended up losing 8–1 to the Eastern Bloc side. Game 2 against group favourites Norway was just as tough for the Brits along a spirited performance saw them just 1–0 down after the first GB collapsed to an 8–3 defeat.

Game 3 against Denmark saw a pulsating clash from end to end which saw GB register their first points with a 4–4 draw; however, after leading the Danes were 1–0 at the end of the 1st. The Netherlands, a long term bogey team of the Brits, skated to a 4–2 win over GB. GB's final game against Italy proved too much for them and they were defeated as they had been the previous year to an experienced Italian side, this time 4–2.

GB were relegated, or so was thought. However, due to the SARS pandemic in China the World Championships were cancelled for that year and the IIHF did not relegate any teams from any divisions, effectively rescuing GB from relegation.

Record: 0–4–1

Team roster:

Zoe Bayne – Sheffield
Kirstin Beattie – Murrayfield
Nicola Bicknell – Slough
Verity Boome – Slough
Heather Brunning – Bracknell
Laura Burke – Sheffield
Vicky Burton – Bracknell
Lynsey Emmerson – Sunderland
Alex von Haselberg – Guildford
Fiona King – Guildford
Teresa Lewis – Sunderland
Eleanor Maitland – Kilmarnock
Ami Merrick – Cardiff
Claire Oldfield – Sunderland
Vicky Robbins – Basingstoke
Angela Taylor – Paisley
Emily Turner – Sheffield
Gemma Watt – Paisley
Gillian Wyatt – Kingston
Hannah Young – Guildford
Manager – Ian Turner. Head Coach – Tony Hall. Assistant Coach – Reg Wilcox.

2004
Vipiteno-Sterzing, Italy

From a standings point of view, the 2004 saw GB's worst ever performance in international ice hockey, with defeats to Denmark, Italy, Slovakia, the Netherlands and Australia.

However, when a team is washed out a goal on a wraparound due to the referee 'losing sight of the puck' as it went round the net, there is not much to be done. GB battled desperately hard under some of the worst refereeing ever seen in an international competition.

GB were relegated to Division 3 along with Australia.

Record: 0–5–0

Team roster:

Zoe Bayne – Sheffield
Kirstin Beattie – Murrayfield
Nicola Bicknell – Slough
Lynsey Emmerson – Sheffield
Louise Fisher – Guildford
Lauren Halliwell – Kingston
Alex von Haselberg – Guildford
Kelly Herring – Peterborough
Becky Kasner – Whitley Bay
Fiona King – Guildford
Eleanor Maitland – Kilmarnock
Ami Merrick – Cardiff
Claire Oldfield – Sunderland
Vicky Robbins – Basingstoke
Helen Stowe – Sunderland
Angela Taylor – Pailsey
Emily Turner – Sheffield
Gemma Watt – Sunderland
Katherine Wiggins – Guildford
Gillian Wyatt – Sheffield
Hannah Young – Guildford
Manager – Ian Turner. Head Coach – Reg Wilcox. Assistant Coach – Jo Abbs

2005
Cape Town, South Africa

Division III was the setting for GB. GB started off the tournament in impressive fashion easily dispatching Hungary 5–0 followed by an 11–0 demolition of Belgium.

GB's minds were however firmly planted on the 3rd game, without a doubt the title decider. GB went a goal down at 26:56 before Newcastle's Teresa Lewis opened the account for GB on the half hour mark.

With the scores neatly tied at 1 heading into the final period, GB battled hard. University of New Hampshire's Angela Taylor picked up a penalty for highsticking at 47:39, and with eight seconds left in the game heartbreak as Slovenia took the lead. GB were never able to get back in the game and ended losing 4–1 with the final goal placed into the empty net.

Game 4 saw GB take out their frustrations of the previous game with a 19–0 victory over South Africa, who were saved relegation by the IIHF Women's Committee as they expanded the Elite competition to nine teams, and thus no teams were relegated this time around.

Game 5 saw GB finally lay the ghost of a year ago with a 6–2 victory over Australia to ensure GB's 2nd place finish.

Record: 4–1–0

Team Roster:

Zoe Bayne – Sheffield
Kirstin Beattie – Murrayfield
Nicola Bicknell – Slough
Laura Burke – Sheffield
Lynsey Emmerson – Sunderland
Louise Fisher – Guildford
Lauren Halliwell – Kingston
Kelly Herring – Slough
Becky Kasner – Whitley Bay
Beth Kavanagh – Flintshire
Fiona King – Guildford
Alice Lamb – Slough
Claire Oldfield – Sunderland
Vicky Robbins – Basingstoke
Angela Taylor – Paisley
Emily Turner – Sheffield
Katherine Wiggins – Guildford
Gillian Wyatt – Sheffield
Laura Urquhart – Nottingham
Teresa Lewis – Sunderland
Manager: Ian Turner, Head Coach: Reg Wilcox. Assistant Coach: Jo Abbs

Overall Record
GB's all time Competitive International record stands at: 14–28–3

References